The International Hockey League (IHL) lasted from 1992 to 1996. It replaced the Soviet Union's Championship league. The last season was in 1995–96, as the league was replaced by the Russian Superleague the following season.

There were two awards in the league. One was the regular season winner, and the other was the winner of the cup.

Champions

See also
 Russian Elite Hockey Scoring Champion
 Russian Elite Hockey Goal Scoring Champion

Sources
International Hockey League 
Sports 123

 
Defunct ice hockey leagues in Russia
1992–93 in Russian ice hockey leagues
1993–94 in Russian ice hockey leagues
1994–95 in Russian ice hockey leagues
1995–96 in Russian ice hockey leagues
Sports leagues established in 1992
Sports leagues disestablished in 1996
1992 establishments in Russia
1996 disestablishments in Russia
Sport in the Commonwealth of Independent States